WDND (1490 AM) was a radio station licensed to serve the South Bend, Indiana, United States, area.

History

WHOT
The station began broadcasting in 1944 and held the call sign WHOT. WHOT aired a full service format, with music, news, talk, comedy, drama, and variety programs, along with a Polish program mornings and religious programs on Sundays. Bob Bell worked at WHOT in the late 1940s. In 1954, WHOT was sold to the University of Notre Dame for $140,000.

WNDU
In 1955, the station's call sign was changed to WNDU. The station aired an oldies format from the mid to late 1970s. In 1979, the station adopted a contemporary hits format, with extra disco at night. WNDU aired a country music format in the 1980s. In 1990, the station adopted an oldies format. In 1995, the station switched to an all 1970s music format, with programming from Westwood One. In 1998, the University of Notre Dame sold WNDU and sister station 92.9 WNDU-FM to Artistic Media Partners.

WNDV
On November 23, 1998, the station's call sign was changed to WNDV, while its sister station's call sign was changed to WNDV-FM. In 1999, the station began simulcasting the contemporary hits format of its FM sister station, 92.9 WNDV-FM.

WDND
In 2006, the station adopted the sports talk format which had been airing on AM 1580 WDND, and 1490's call sign was changed to WDND on May 5, 2006. WDND was an affiliate of ESPN Radio. The station was off the air for a period in January 2007, after its tower fell during a storm.

End of operations
On April 29, 2009, the station was taken off the air, in preparation for its transmitting tower site on the Notre Dame campus to be dismantled to make way for the Compton Family Ice Arena. Artistic moved the WDND call sign and its sports format to 1620 AM. The former call letters of the 1620 station, WPNT, were assigned to the silent 1490 operation on May 13, 2009. On May 11, 2011, the license for 1490 AM was canceled by the FCC.

References

DND (AM)
Radio stations established in 1944
1944 establishments in Indiana
Radio stations disestablished in 2011
2011 disestablishments in Indiana
Defunct radio stations in the United States
DND